Thio Li-ann (born 10 March 1968) is a Singaporean law professor at the National University of Singapore.  She was educated at the University of Oxford, Harvard Law School and the University of Cambridge. In January 2007, she was appointed a Nominated Member of Parliament (NMP) in Singapore's 11th Parliament.

Early life and education
Thio Li-ann was born in Singapore on 10 March 1968. Her mother is Dr. Thio (née Huang) Su Mien, former dean of the Faculty of Law of the National University of Singapore (NUS) and presently senior executive director of TSMP Law Corporation; her brother, Thio Shen Yi, is joint managing director of the same law firm.

Thio was educated at the Singapore Chinese Girls' School (1975–1984) and Hwa Chong Junior College (1984–1986), at the latter on a Humanities Award from the Ministry of Education. She took a Bachelor of Arts (B.A. (Hons.)) in jurisprudence at Keble College, Oxford between 1987 and 1990. At Oxford she was awarded the Law Moderations Book Prize (Constitutional Law, Criminal Law and Roman Law) in 1988. She was called to the bar as a barrister at Gray's Inn in 1991.

Academic career
Thio joined the Faculty of Law of the NUS as a senior tutor in 1991, and was appointed Lecturer in 1992. That same year she embarked on postgraduate law studies at Harvard Law School on a National University of Singapore Overseas Graduate Scholarship, and obtained a Master of Laws (LL.M.) in 1993. She returned to NUS, where in 1997 she was appointed an assistant professor. Between 1997 and 2000 she carried out PhD research at the University of Cambridge on another NUS Overseas Graduate Scholarship, and was duly conferred this degree in 2000. Her PhD dissertation, entitled Managing Babel: The International Legal Protection of Minorities in the Twentieth Century, was subsequently published by Martinus Nijhoff Publishers in 2005. In June 2000 she was appointed an associate professor, and achieved the rank of full Professor in July 2006. Her research interests are the following:

Constitutionalism and human rights in Asia.
Domestic and comparative perspectives of constitutional law and administrative law.
International human rights law and the rights of peoples.
Law and religion.
Public international law, its history and theory.

Thio was Young Asian Scholar at the Melbourne University Law School in 1997, was ranked as an NUS Excellent Teacher in 2001–2002 and 2002–2003, and was given a Young Researcher Award by NUS in 2004. In March 2006, she was a visiting lecturer at the Faculty of Law of the University of Hong Kong, where she was one of the academics teaching a course on "National Protection of Human Rights". In September of that year she returned to the University of Melbourne as a senior fellow of its graduate law programme to teach a course entitled "Constitutionalism in Asian Societies".

Thio served as chief editor of the Singapore Journal of International & Comparative Law between 2000 and 2003, and since 2005 has been General Editor of the Asian Yearbook of International Law. She is also on the editorial or advisory boards of the Singapore Yearbook of International Law, the New Zealand Yearbook of International Law (since 2003), the University of Bologna Law Review (since 2016), and Human Rights & International Legal Discourse (since 2006), and is corresponding editor (Singapore) for Blaustein & Flanz's Constitutions of the Countries of the World (since 2001) and the International Journal of Constitutional Law (since 2001). Since 2001 she has also been a contributor on constitutional and administrative law to the Singapore Academy of Law Annual Review of Singapore Cases.

Thio was also a consultant to a delegation of the House of Representatives of Japan (30 September 2002) and to the University of Warwick on academic freedom issues (2005).

NYU Law School controversy
Thio was to be a visiting human rights professor at New York University School of Law in the fall of 2009 until she withdrew her acceptance in July 2009. Many noted the irony in her appointment, and prompted calls for condemnation of her "anti-gay hate speech" before Parliament. The university's gay and lesbian law student group, NYU OUTLaw, released a statement calling for the condemnation.

NYU Law School's Dean Richard Revesz issued a memorandum stating "the Law School categorically rejects the point of view expressed in Professor Thio's speech, as evidenced by our early and longstanding commitment to end discrimination on the basis of sexual orientation." Students at NYU Law School have issued statements as well.

Thio then sent an 18-point defense memo to the entire NYU Law faculty. On 22 July 2009, she informed the school of her withdrawal from the appointment, citing hostility by its community towards her views and low enrollment; it was reported that only 9 students applied for her course on human rights and 5 for her other course on constitutionalism.

Political career

From 18 January 2007, Thio was appointed a Nominated Member of Parliament of the 11th Session of the Parliament of Singapore for a two-and-a-half-year term.

In October 2007, during a review by the Parliament of Singapore on the Penal Code, it decided not to repeal section 377A of the Code and thus continued to criminalise sexual activity between males. In the course of the debate in Parliament, Thio gave a speech to support the continued criminalisation of sexual activity between males, and likened gay sex to "shoving a straw up your nose to drink." She claimed to have support from a majority of Singaporeans, and stated she spoke "at the risk of being burned at the stake by militant activists." At the same time, Thio mentioned the existence of an active gay agenda that seeks to lobby the government and radically change sexual norms.

The Internet subsequently saw a flood of websites heavily rebutting Thio's speech, most of which focused on her lurid straw-up-the-nose analogy. Local journalist Janadas Devan, in a feature article in The Straits Times on 27 October, titled "377A debate and the rewriting of pluralism", the pointed out that the speech was heavily laced with phrases and imagery from the Dominionist movement. Another Straits Times writer, Chua Mui Hoong, also wrote an article titled "Rules of Engagement for God and Politics" on 16 November 2007. In it, Chua acknowledged Thio's position in her speech that secularism could challenge religion. However, Chua disagreed that religion has been antagonised in Singapore, and encouraged that specific explanation be given as to how the repeal of a law would in reality harm the Singaporean society.

Thio's speech also drew the criticism of Michael Kirby, then a judge of the High Court of Australia, who referenced it in a speech he delivered in Brisbane on 16 November 2007. The content of his speech was subsequently published in The Sydney Morning Herald on 19 November 2007.

During the debate, Thio revealed that playwright Alfian Sa'at had sent her a short email saying, among other things, that "I hope I outlive you long enough to see the repeal of 377A and on that day I will piss on your grave." Sa'at later took responsibility for the email, saying it was sent in a moment of folly in response to the rumour that Thio had called the police to complain about a "Pink Picnic" some members of the gay community were organising in the Botanic Gardens. Thio later denied the allegation, and Sa'at apologised. Subsequently, in November 2007, Thio was alerted by the media to an anonymous threatening letter addressed to her stating: "We know where you work, we'll send people there to hunt you down". Thio made a police report the same day.

AWARE Takeover by Thio Su Mien 

In 2009, a group of conservative Christian women from the Church of Our Savior, under the leadership of Josie Lau and orchestrated by Thio's mother, Thio Su Mien, took over the executive council of the group alleging AWARE, a non-governmental organization in Singapore concerned with promoting gender equality. On 26 May 2009, during Thio's first speech in parliament since the event, Thio accused the local press of biased reporting on the events surrounding the attempted takeover. Han Fook Kwang, then editor of The Straits Times, responded in an editorial and expressed his sadness at the vindictiveness of "critics and the length to which they are prepared to go to attack our professionalism" and integrity, detailing the sequence of events and how their journalists had investigated and reported on the proceedings.

Question regarding support from the majority
Thio's strong position towards retaining the code drew much protest from some Singaporeans. Two issues were constantly raised. The first issue was the question of the real existence of a majority against repeal of the code. The second issue was the question of whether a stance against homosexual behavior would equate to wanting a code to criminalize the act of sodomy. Concerns were also raised by a law professor on whether it was realistically possible to enforce such a code, whether it would lead to dangers of entrapment, and whether the informal position of the government not to enforce the code would reverse overnight.

Personal life
Thio was born to Thio Gim Hock, who was the chairman of OUE Limited, and Thio Su Mien, the former dean of NUS law school and founder of the TSMP Law Corporation. Her maternal grandfather is Reverend Huang Yang Ying, first principal of Anglican High School. Her brother, Thio Shen Yi, a senior counsel, who manages TSMP with his wife, Stefanie Yuen-Thio.

Religious affiliation
Thio is a Christian. In an interview with the local daily The Straits Times on 2 November 2007, Thio shared her personal story of how she converted from a "very, very arrogant" atheist to a Christian in 1987. Having entered Oxford University to read jurisprudence, she attended a Christian Union talk then and claimed to be "stopped" by a voice.

"I basically had a sense that God was talking to me. I had stood up to walk out and I heard someone say, 'Stop'. And no one was around me. Everybody was busy doing their own thing. I was one of only one or two Chinese girls in this whole room of ang mohs. And then I just had the sense that I had encountered God, that he knew my name and I was shocked." Thio was quoted as saying in the interview.

She added, "I don't know what right wing is. This is funny because I was always considered a political leftie and now I'm a rightie."

Selected works

Representative articles
.
.
.
.
.
.

Contributions towards books
.
.
.
.
.
.
.

Books
.
.
.
.
.

References

References
.
.
.

External links

 Official website of the Faculty of Law, National University of Singapore

1968 births
Academic staff of the National University of Singapore Faculty of Law
Alumni of Keble College, Oxford
Alumni of the University of Cambridge
Harvard Law School alumni
International law scholars
Living people
Scholars of administrative law
Scholars of constitutional law
Singaporean Christians
Singaporean Nominated Members of Parliament
Singaporean people of Chinese descent
Singaporean women in politics
Women legal scholars